Qantas Freight is a subsidiary company of Australia's largest airline Qantas, responsible for the air cargo operations of the Qantas group. It is the owner of freight airline Express Freighters Australia, freight forwarder Qantas Courier and trucking company Jets Transport Express. Qantas Freight was also a partner in two joint ventures with Australia Post: Australian airExpress, specialising in door-to-door package delivery, and StarTrack, a road freight company. In November 2012 Qantas Freight fully acquired Australia air Express and divested its shareholding in Star Track to Australia Post. Qantas Freight was also the owner of Asian-based freight forwarder DPEXWorldwide until that company was acquired by its competitor Toll Holdings in 2010.

Destinations
As of September 2013 Qantas Freight directly serves 50 international and 80 domestic destinations. Qantas Freight has the ability to reach 480 global destinations through its airline partners, including Emirates, which it signed a cargo cooperation agreement with in 2013.

Fleet 

 
In addition to placing freight on board the international and domestic flights of Qantas and Jetstar, Qantas Freight operates the following aircraft, as of January 2023:

In June 2016, the 737-400F, two of the 737-300Fs and three BAe 146s were rebranded and are operated as a dedicated fleet for Australia Post and StarTrack.

In April 2019, Qantas Freight announced it would wet lease two Atlas Air Boeing 747-8F aircraft to replace the two current wet-leased 747-400F aircraft. The first aircraft landed in Sydney on 27 August with small Qantas Freight stickers applied, with the second due later in the week.

In August 2019, Qantas Freight announced a deal with Australia Post which was worth $1.4 billion. Included in the deal was Qantas Freight's announcement of the purchase of the world's first A321P2F, of which they ordered 3 to be delivered from October 2020.

In February 2023, Qantas announced that 3 additional A321P2F would be ordered for delivery in 2024 and 2025.

Price-fixing case 
Legal action was brought in the United States against a number of airlines' freight operations over allegations of price fixing between 2000 and 2006, including Qantas Freight. Following the imposition of a fine of US$300 million on British Airways, in November 2007 Qantas Freight agreed to plead guilty in a US court and was fined US$61 million. In a separate development the former head of Qantas Freight in the United States was sentenced to eight months imprisonment in May 2008. The Australian Competition & Consumer Commission also launched legal action in Australia, and in October 2008 Qantas' management agreed to settle the case with a fine of A$20 million. Qantas is also facing a number of class action lawsuits.

References

External links

Official website

Airlines established in 2001
Australian companies established in 2001
Cargo airlines of Australia
Companies based in Sydney
Freight